Cuchara or cucharas may refer to:

People
 John Henry Lloyd aka "El Cuchara" (1884-1964) U.S. baseball shortstop and manager

Places
 Cuchara, Colorado, USA; an unincorporated community in Huerfano County
 Cuchara Formation, a geologic formation in Colorado, USA
 Cucharas Pass, a mountain pass in the Sangre de Cristo Mountains in south central Colorado, USA
 Cucharas River, a tributary of the Huerfano River in Colorado, USA
 Reserva Natural Punta Cucharas, a nature reserve in Barrio Canas, Ponce, Puerto Rico
 Cucharas, Ozuluama de Mascareñas, Veracruz, Mexico, see Ozuluama de Mascareñas (municipality)

Other uses
 Cuchara Valley, a former ski resort (now a county park called Cuchara Mountain Park) in Colorado, USA, see List of Colorado ski resorts
 Cuchara (2001 song) from the album Responsorium (album)

See also
 Spoon (disambiguation) , "cuchara" is Spanish for 'spoon'

Disambiguation pages